Giselle Cossard Binon Omindarewa, (31 May 1923, Tangier - 21 January 2016, Duke of Caxias), Mãe-de-santo of Candomblé of Rio de Janeiro, was a French Brazilian anthropologist and writer. She was also known as Mother Giselle of Yemoja, Daughter of Saint John of Goméia, Initiated for the Orisha Yemoja.

Childhood
Gisele Cossard was born in 1923 in Tangier, Morocco, where her father was a military man. Her family raised her in the Catholic faith. Her father was a primary teacher and her mother, a pianist at the Paris Conservatory. During World War I (1914–1918), her father been sent to that extreme tip of Africa, which at the time was a French protectorate,  became fascinated by the country and remained there until 1925. When he returned to France with his wife and the daughter, Gisele mentioned she did not have memories of that period, but according to the researcher Michel Déon, author of the biography Omindarewá - Uma Francesa no Candomblé (Editor Pallas), the collection of art objects that her parents brought from that African country, as well as its fantastic stories, constituted for her "an endless source of wonderment."

During World War II and postwar

Becoming "Brazilian"

Books written by her
Contribution to the Study of Candomblés of Brazil. The Rite Angola. (3rd cycle), 1970
The Daughter of Saint, In: Carlos Eugênio Marcondes de Moura (org.). Olóòrisà: Writings on the Religion of the Orixás. São Paulo, Ágora, 1981
 Anthropologist Says, In: Hubert Fichte. Ethnopoetry: Poetic Anthropology of Afro-Brazilian Religions: 39–91. São Paulo, Brasiliense, 1987.
AWÔ, The Mystery of the Orixás. Ed. Pallas, 2007.

Bibliography
Omindarewa - A Frenchwoman at Candomblé - in search of another truth. Michel Dion. Ed. Pallas, 2002
Mother of Saint to French. Bruno Ribeiro - Brazilian Magazine

Filmography
A cidade das mulheres/ The city of women, documentary - directed by Lázaro Faria, Brazil, 2005.
Gisele Omindarewa, directed by Clarice Ehlers Peixoto, Brazil, 2009.

References 

memoires-de-candomble-omindarewa-iyalorisa Dion 1998

Brazilian anthropologists
Brazilian women anthropologists
French emigrants to Brazil
1923 births
2016 deaths
Brazilian Candomblés
French Candomblés
French expatriates in Morocco